Killyman is a small village and a civil parish in Northern Ireland, situated on the eastern boundary of County Tyrone and extending into County Armagh. The majority of townlands are in the historic barony of Dungannon Middle in County Tyrone, the rest being in the barony of Oneilland West in County Armagh.

The settlement, which developed around a crossroads on the road from Belfast to Dungannon, consists mainly of a number of single dwellings, although there has also been some in-depth housing development in recent years. Local facilities include a small number of shops, primary schools and churches. Mortimer O'Sullivan was the Church of Ireland rector here in the 1830s.

Notable locals
 Fra Fee, actor and singer

Schools
 Killyman Primary School
 Laghey Primary School

Sport
Killyman St. Mary's, local GAA club.

Civil parish of Killyman
The civil parish contains the villages of Killyman and Tamnamore.

Townlands
The civil parish contains the following townlands:

Annaghbeg
Ballynakilly
Bernagh
Bogbane
Bovean
Cavan
Clonmore
Clontyclay
Coash
Cohannan
Corr
Corrainy
Culnagrew
Derrycorry North
Derrycorry South
Derrygally
Derrygally Demesne
Derryhirk
Derryhubbert East
Derryhubbert North
Derryhubbert South
Derrymeen
Dreemore
Drumard Cross
Drumard Glebe
Drumaspil
Drumcrow
Drumenagh
Drumhorrik
Drumkee
Drummuck
Dungorman
Gortrea
Gortshalgan
Keenaghan
Kinego
Laghey
Lederg
Lisnahoy
Lowertown
Moyroe
Mullaghteige
Mullenakill North
Mullenakill South
Mullenakill West
Tamlaghtmore
Tartlaghan
Tempanroe
True

See also
List of towns and villages in Northern Ireland
List of civil parishes of County Armagh
List of civil parishes of County Tyrone

References

External links
 Northern Ireland Planning Service map (pdf)
 Public Record Office of Northern Ireland

 
Villages in County Tyrone